Express Bus Terminal Station is a station on the Seoul Subway Line 3, Line 7, and Line 9. The stations are located in Banpo-dong, Seocho-gu, Seoul.

It is located underneath the Seoul Express Bus Terminal (a.k.a. Gangnam  Bus Terminal). There are several stores, including clothing and book stores, located throughout the station. The station also offers free internet portals for browsing the web and checking e-mail, which are located by the number 3 line. According to KT-published statistics in December 2010, the station was the network's most popular WiFi hotspot of all Seoul Metropolitan Subway stations, followed by Sadang Station, Dongdaemun Station, Jamsil Station and Jongno 3-ga Station. On November 19, 2010, the network's WiFi traffic at the station peaked at 23 gigabytes.

This station is one of the most crowded subway station in the country, along with Gangnam, Jamsil,  Samseong, Sindorim, and Sillim Station.

The newly renovated Shinsegae department store is now connected from exit 8 into the famille street food section.

Station layout

Line 3

Line 7

Line 9

History
 October 18, 1985 : This station was opened on Line 3.
 August 1, 2000 : The Line 7 was opened, making this station a transfer point.
 July 24, 2009: The Line 9 was opened, thus adding another station in this transfer point.

Exits
 Exit 1 : Seoul Express Bus Terminal (Gyeongbu Line, Yeongdong Line)
 Exit 2 : Banpo Mido APT, Forwarding Agency
 Exit 3 : JW Marriott Hotel Seoul, Shinsegae Department Store Gangnam
 Exit 4 : Catholic University of Korea
 Exit 5 : National Library of Korea, Seoul Palace Hotel
 Exit 6 : Jamwon Elementary School
 Exit 7 : Central City (Honam Line)
 Exit 8 : New Banpo APT, Hanshin APT
 Exit 8-1: Hangang Park
 Exit 8-2 : Banwon Elementary School

Vicinity
Central City is a national transportation hub, as it connects two major subway lines (No.3 and No.7) that provide access to the Seoul Metropolitan Area, to several bus routes that provide access to other cities throughout South Korea. There are over 60 local bus service routes, airport limousine buses to Incheon International Airport and express buses connecting to almost 60 cities around Korea. Also within Central City is Shinsegae Department store, Marriott Hotel and Central Park. There are various facilities such as ceremony halls, Millennium Hall for large-scale events and other convenient facilities such as banks, clinics, a stock exchange, a post office and a large-scale parking lot. Central City is known as a complex building, which improved the status of Korean architectural culture, according to its complex cultural facilities.  Central City is a high-quality shopping mall with ‘Marques Plaza’, 'Youngpoong Bookstore’, ‘Central 6 Cinema’ ‘Theme Park'. Within the complex, the World Food Court offers food from around the globe in an upscale, department store environment.  Within Shinsegae Department Store, there are foreign clothing outlets including Banana Republic and The Gap, among others.  Some of these shops have clothing that is imported from abroad, thus having "western" sizes that are difficult to find in Korea.
Directions :
At Express Bus Terminal (Seoul Subway Line No.3) Exit No.2 → Walk towards Honamseon → Entrance of Central City → Young Plaza (B1 floor)
Express Bus Terminal (Seoul Subway Line No.3) Exit No.2 → Walk towards Shinsegae Department Store, Honamseon → Central City (1st floor)

Gangnam Express Bus Station Clothing Market: is an underground market with over 1,000 stores. It was opened in 1982 and located in Banpo-dong. It sells low price items such as clothes, wedding items, souvenirs, seasonal items, flowers, and electronics. It runs along entire city blocks and offer refuge during cold winters and humid summer.

Passengers

Gallery

References

Metro stations in Seocho District
Seoul Metropolitan Subway stations
Seoul Subway Line 3
Seoul Subway Line 7
Seoul Subway Line 9
Railway stations in South Korea opened in 1985